Alzano may refer to the following places in Italy:

Alzano Lombardo, in the province of Bergamo
Alzano Scrivia, in the province of Alessandria